Abedus indentatus is a species of giant water bug in the family Belostomatidae. It is found in Central America and North America.

References

Belostomatidae
Articles created by Qbugbot
Insects described in 1854

Hemiptera of Central America
Hemiptera of North America